Socchieve is a comune (municipality) in the Province of Udine in the Italian region Friuli-Venezia Giulia, located about  northwest of Trieste and about  northwest of Udine.

The municipality of Socchieve contains the frazioni (subdivisions, mainly villages and hamlets) Caprizi, Dilignìdis, Feltrone, Lungis, Mediis (municipal seat), Nonta, Priuso, and Viaso.

Socchieve borders the following municipalities: Ampezzo, Enemonzo, Forni di Sotto, Ovaro, Preone, Raveo, Tramonti di Sopra, Tramonti di Sotto.

References

External links
 Official website

Cities and towns in Friuli-Venezia Giulia